The Greatest Battle is a 1978 Euro War film co-written and directed by Umberto Lenzi and starring an all-star ensemble cast, including Giuliano Gemma, Helmut Berger, Stacy Keach, Ray Lovelock, Samantha Eggar, Henry Fonda, Evelyn Stewart, and John Huston. The Italian-West German-Yugoslavian co-production was produced by Mino Loy and Luciano Martino for Titanus. It was also released under the titles The Biggest Battle and Battle Force.
The plot centers on a group of German and Allied nationals throughout the early years of World War II, including a British commando (Gemma), an American general (Fonda) and his son (Lovelock), a Jewish actress (Eggar), a war correspondent (Huston), and two very different German officers (Berger and Keach). The film climaxes in a recreation of the Battle of the Mareth Line in Tunisia.

Plot
During the 1936 Berlin Olympics, Wehrmacht officer Manfred Roland organizes a dinner with a group of friends and international acquaintances to celebrate the event. The guests include famed German actress Annelise Hackermann, American Brigadier General Harold Foster, and Canadian war correspondent Sean O’Hara. Roland and Foster gift each other matching medals reading “In God We Trust” in English and German respectively, and the group resolve to meet again in four years.

Six years later, Europe is in the midst of World War II, and the once-friends have been forcibly sent separate ways. Hackermann has married Roland, and though their union is a happy one she lives in hiding due to her secret Jewish heritage making her a target of the Nazis’ racial policies. In America, Foster's younger son John flunks out of college and subsequently joins the Army like his older brother Ted, despite his father's reservations. Despite their mutual hopes that the war will be over soon, the conflict only escalates and America soon enters the war against Germany. Roland is assigned to deal with partisans in occupied territories, and is subsequently forced to perpetrate summary executions despite his moral objections. Annalise is forced into performing sexual favors by a lecherous SS colonel who threatens her with arrest over her Jewish heritage. O’Hara, meanwhile, manages to use his old military connections to be assigned to frontline correspondence duty in North Africa.

In Paris, Wehrmacht Lt. Kurt Zimmer begins a transactional relationship with Danielle, a beautiful French woman whose husband was killed by the Germans and prostitutes herself to the occupying personnel to survive. Having requested a transfer to the North African front, Zimmer is given a “farewell” assignment in France; to oversee the transportation of a massive train-mounted cannon targeted by guerillas. Meanwhile, John Foster is assigned to commando duty due to his fluent French, and parachutes behind enemy lines to join with a local French resistance cell in a mission to destroy the cannon. The mission is a success, but John is the sole survivor of his unit, while Zimmer narrowly escapes with his life.

Months later, John, Zimmer, and Roland are all separately reassigned to Tunisia on their respective sides. John befriends British commando Captain Martin Scott, who is forced to leave his family during Christmastime to return to duty. Roland narrowly survives an Allied air attack and meets Zimmer, who reads him a letter sent by Annalise. Unbeknownst to them both, Annalise is arrested by the Gestapo at the whims of Jurgens. Her interrogators offer her reprieve from the concentration camps if she exposes the locations of her colleagues, forced underground by the Nazi regime. Without any means of escape, Annalise manages to break from captivity long enough to commit suicide.

The Allies prepare for an offensive against the Mareth Line, with Scott assigned to clear a pathway of mines for a tank detachment. The night before the attack, John is contacted by his father, who tells him that his brother has been killed in action. O’Hara tries to comfort John by quoting him John Donne’s “For Whom the Bell Tolls”, while Scott sets out to clear the mines. Things go wrong when they're caught by German sentries led by Zimmer, and pinned down in a foxhole until daybreak. With only minutes left until the tanks arrive, Scott and his remaining men make a break for the tanks, Scott managing to climb atop and warn the crew before they reach the mines. Thanks to his efforts, the Allied tanks manage to break through the German defenses; Roland is killed as his position is overrun, and Scott loots the “In God We Trust” medallion off of his body. O’Hara is killed by stray artillery fire, and in Paris, Danielle is killed by partisans who mistake her for a collaborator.

With the Battle of the Mareth Line ending in an Allied victory, Scott gifts John the medallion, and he notes its similarities to his father's own without realizing the significance. John is promoted and reassigned as an aide to General George Patton, and Scott tells John that there are more battles and more wars to come. In America, General Foster visits his elder son's grave as he's informed of John's promotion.

Cast 

 Giuliano Gemma as Capt. Martin Scott
 Helmut Berger as Lt. Kurt Zimmer
 Samantha Eggar as Annelise Hackermann
 Stacy Keach as Lt. Manfred Roland
 Ray Lovelock as John Foster
 Henry Fonda as Brig. Gen. Harold Foster
 John Huston as Sean O'Hara
 Edwige Fenech as Danielle
 Guy Doleman as Brig. Gen. Whitmore
 Venantino Venantini as Michael
 Patrick Reynolds as Christopher
 Ida Galli as Miss Scott
 Rik Battaglia as Yves
 Andrea Bosic as Mimis Parnat
 Geoffrey Copleston as Colonel Jurgens
 Mirko Ellis as Captain Hans Becker 
 Giacomo Rossi Stuart as Batelli
 Robert Spafford as Gen. George Patton
 Michele Soavi as Ted Foster
 Orson Welles as the Narrator

Release
The Greatest Battle passed Italian censors on 19 January 1978. The film was released under several titles, including La Battaglia di Mareth, The Biggest Battle and The Great Battle. The American version was cut by several minutes and adds a voiceover narration by Orson Welles.

Reception
Mick Martin and Marsha Porter wrote that the film has "lots of phony battle scenes, bad acting, and a poor script".  Leonard Maltin writes: "Amateurish muddle about WW2 combines tired vignettes with well-known stars, dubbed sequences with others, and newsreel footage narrated by Orson Welles. A waste of everybody's time".

References

External links

Films directed by Umberto Lenzi
Films shot in Almería
Films scored by Franco Micalizzi
1970s war films
West German films
Macaroni Combat films
German war films
Constantin Film films
German World War II films
Italian World War II films
English-language Italian films
English-language German films
1970s Italian-language films
1970s Italian films
1970s German films